Frank Valentine Weston  (16 September 1935 – 29 April 2003) was suffragan Bishop of Knaresborough in the then Diocese of Ripon and Leeds from December 1997 until his death in April 2003.

Weston was born into a clerical family – his uncle was Frank Weston (Bishop of Zanzibar) – he was educated at Christ's Hospital and The Queen's College, Oxford (BA 1960, MA 1964). He then studied for ordination at Lichfield Theological College.

Weston was a curate in Atherton (1961–65).  Then began an association of more than 20 years with the College of the Ascension at Selly Oak, initially as chaplain (1965–69) and then as principal (1969–76). From 1973 until 1976 he was also Vice-President of Selly Oak Colleges and from 1976 until 1982 Principal and Pantonian Professor at Edinburgh Theological College. In 1982 he was appointed Archdeacon of Oxford and a residentiary canon of Christ Church, Oxford. He held the post until his elevation to the episcopate in 1997 and continued his association with Christ Church with an appointment as "emeritus student", a position roughly equivalent to an emeritus fellowship.

Weston was appointed Bishop of Knaresborough (the suffragan bishop for the then Diocese of Ripon and Leeds) in 1997 and held office until his death in 2003.

References

 

1935 births
People educated at Christ's Hospital
Alumni of The Queen's College, Oxford
Archdeacons of Oxford
Bishops of Knaresborough
2003 deaths
Alumni of Lichfield Theological College